Priya Anand (born 17 September 1986) is an Indian actress and model who predominantly appears in Tamil films. She has also appeared in Telugu, Hindi, Kannada and Malayalam films. After pursuing higher studies in the US, she began a career in modelling in 2008 before making her acting debut in the Tamil film Vaamanan (2009) and then her Telugu debut in Leader a year later. She made her Hindi debut in 2012 with a supporting role in English Vinglish and subsequently appeared in the films Fukrey (2013) and Rangrezz (2013).

Early life
Priya Anand was born on 17 September 1986 in Chennai, Tamil Nadu. She is the only child to a Tamil mother and a half-Telugu, half-Marathi father. She was brought up in both her parents' hometowns, Chennai and Hyderabad, becoming fluent in Tamil and Telugu. Besides native languages, Priya is proficient in English, Bengali, Hindi, Marathi and Spanish as well.

Priya became fascinated with films, developing an interest in cinema, since childhood, and noted that she has been dreaming of getting into the film industry and working on technical aspects of film making, but confesses she never thought of becoming an actor. She moved to the US, where she pursued her higher studies. Keeping her later career in mind, she studied communications and journalism at SUNY Albany. In 2008, she returned to India and ventured into modeling, appearing in various television advertisements like Nutrine Maha Lacto, Prince Jewellery and Cadbury Dairy Milk.

Career

2009–2011: Early work in Tamil and Telugu cinema 
Priya was initially supposed to make her acting debut in the Tamil film Pugaippadam, which she signed up first, but since its release was delayed until 2010, her first release became the action-thriller Vaamanan, directed by newcomer Ahmed. She was signed for the project in late 2008 to portray Divya, a simple girl next-door, whom the male lead character, played by Jai, would fall in love with. The film created some anticipation before its release, mainly due to its hit music by Yuvan Shankar Raja, which enabled a big opening, with the song "Aedho Saigirai", which was picturised on her, being considered as her "claim-to-fame" that made her popular among Tamil audience, and being dubbed as a "Priya song". However the film got a lukewarm reception and fared only averagely at the Chennai box office.

In 2010, three of her films released within a short span of time, the first on New Year 2010, which was the college-life based drama Pugaippadam, a film revolving around the friendship between seven students. Priya enacted the character of one of the student roles, a Malayali Christian named Shiney George. The film opened to mixed reviews and proved to be commercially unsuccessful. She next starred in her first Telugu film, AVM Productions' Sekhar Kammula directed political drama Leader, alongside newcomers Rana Daggubati and Richa Gangopadhyay. She recalls that an assistant director of Kammula had found her on Facebook and invited her and how she had to audition thrice for the film to prove herself and eventually got the offer. She played Ratna Prabha, a television channel reporter and friend to a young man, who would later go on to become a political leader. Although her screen presence in the film was very limited, her performance garnered overwhelming response and was well received, while the film itself earned positive reviews and became a critical success. The Dil Raju-produced family entertainer Rama Rama Krishna Krishna was her last 2010 release, in which she plays the love interest of the film's male protagonist. She next starred in 180, a bilingual Tamil-Telugu project by ad filmmaker Jayendra, which was her only release in 2011.

2012–2015: Debut in Bollywood and breakthrough in Tamil cinema
She has made her debut Hindi film English Vinglish (2012), produced by R Balki, in which she had shared screen with Sridevi, who Priya admires and considers her idol. Priya said: "I signed this film just to be up and close to an artist who has influenced me and to be part of something that was so important to her. I'm doing this movie as her fan and I'm fortunate enough to play a very important part in her journey in the film". She acted in Telugu romance movie, Ko Antey Koti (2012). Her Hindi films in 2013 were Rangrezz and Fukrey. In Tamil, she played the lead  role in Ethir Neechal (2013) alongside Sivakarthikeyan and Nandita Swetha. The film is a box-office winner. In Vanakkam Chennai (2013) with Shiva, the film has received to positive reviews and was "Hit" at the box office.

She acted simultaneously for four Tamil films; Arima Nambi (2014) features Vikram Prabhu, Irumbu Kuthirai (2014) stars Atharvaa, with Vimal in Oru Oorla Rendu Raja (2014) and Vai Raja Vai (2015) features her opposite Gautham Karthik. Priya Anand has shot for a special cameo in G. V. Prakash Kumar’s Trisha Illana Nayanthara (2015) which is being directed by newcomer Adhik Ravichandran.

2017–present
Priya Anand debuted in Malayalam with the Prithviraj starrer horror thriller Ezra (2017). The film was released to positive reviews. The next was a Tamil movie, Muthuramalingam (2017). However this movie was a failure. Priya Anand made her Kannada debut with the much-hyped Raajakumara (2017) and added a new dimension to her career. His next projects were followed by comedies in Tamil with Kootathil Oruthan (2017) and Hindi with Fukrey Returns (2017). Priya Anand's long time desire to work in a period film highly anticipated Malayalam release Kayamkulam Kochunni (2018), which stars Nivin Pauly. Priya's character played a pivotal role in the life of Kochunni. Priya, who won over the Kannada cinema audience right in her first film, has worked with Ganesh in Orange (2018). She appeared in the Malayalam Kodathi Samaksham Balan Vakeel (2019) starring Dileep. Priya Anand appears as a Data Analyst for Elections in the  political satire Tamil film LKG (2019). She was seen in Dhruv Vikram’s debut, Adithya Varma (2019), in a supporting role. Priya Anand to reunite opposite Puneeth Rajkumar again in James. The next one in Tamil is Sumo, a comedy-drama in which she is paired opposite Shiva.

Social work
On 20 June 2011, Priya became an ambassador for the Save the Children campaign for both Tamil Nadu and Andhra Pradesh.

Filmography

Film

Television

References

External links

 
 

21st-century Indian actresses
Indian film actresses
Actresses in Hindi cinema
Actresses in Kannada cinema
Actresses in Tamil cinema
Actresses in Telugu cinema
Living people
Marathi people
University at Albany, SUNY alumni
Actresses from Chennai
Female models from Chennai
1986 births
Actresses in Malayalam cinema